Peter Wolf Toth (born December 1947) is a Hungarian-born American sculptor, who immigrated to the United States and settled in Akron, Ohio.  He later studied art at the University of Akron.  He created a series of sculptures called Trail of the Whispering Giants to honor Native Americans. Overall, he has created more than 74 sculptures, including at least one in each state of the United States, and in several provinces and territories of Canada.

Trail of the Whispering Giants

Toth completed his first sculpture, of stone, in La Jolla, California in February 1972.

Thereafter, he decided to embark upon a journey to create a sculpture in each state.  His second sculpture was located in Sand Run Metropolitan Park in his American hometown of Akron, Ohio, which has since been destroyed and not replaced.  Since then he has completed a statue in each of the 50 states, and in several provinces of Canada.  Some states now have more than one sculpture.  Florida has three sculptures located in Fort Lauderdale, Punta Gorda and another which was moved from Hollywood, FL, to Fort Lauderdale.  Toth has replaced some destroyed sculptures with new ones, but not all.  Peter Toth's mission to carve a "Whispering Giant" in all 50 United States was completed in May 1988, when he finished sculpture #58 in Hawaii.

Since then, Toth has continued his mission of honoring oppressed peoples in general and the American Indian in particular.  His most recent Whispering Giant, #74, was completed in 2009 in Vincennes, Indiana.  All are dedicated to the American Indian excepting #73 which is of Medieval King Stephen in Delegyhaza, Hungary, Toth's country of birth.

When discussing his interpretation of what to sculpt for his Winslow, Arizona, project, Toth had this to say:

After 1988 
Toth continues to plan further sculptures in other countries, and also spends time making repairs and performing maintenance on the existing sculptures.  He has created replacement sculptures where statues have been damaged.

References

Further reading

External links

 Photos of sculptures
 Rotaynah sculpture, Akron
 Site dedicated to Toth and his work
 Smithsonian Institution Research Information System (SIRIS) Art Inventories Catalog: Peter Toth inventory

1947 births
Living people
American sculptors
Hungarian sculptors
University of Akron alumni